The 1913–14 İstanbul Football League season was the ninth season of the İstanbul Football League. Fenerbahçe won the league for the second time. Strugglers FC left the league after their sixth match after refusing to change their original kit. Telefoncular FC also left the league after their fifth match. The remaining matches involving these clubs were ruled a 3–0 win for the opposing side. Progress FC changed its name to Altınordu İdman Yurdu SK during the season.

Season

References
http://www.mackolik.com/Standings/Default.aspx?sId=15828
 Dağlaroğlu, Rüştü. Fenerbahçe Spor Kulübü Tarihi 1907-1957

Istanbul Football League seasons
Istanbul
Istanbul